Michael Chang was the defending champion and successfully defended his title, by defeating Petr Korda 5–7, 6–2, 6–1 in the final.

Seeds
The top eight seeds received a bye to the second round.

Draw

Finals

Top half

Section 1

Section 2

Bottom half

Section 3

Section 4

References

External links
 Official results archive (ATP)
 Official results archive (ITF)

1997 ATP Tour